Bayandina is a rural locality (a village) in Cherdynsky District, Perm Krai, Russia. The population was 23 as of 2010. There is 1 street.

Geography 
Bayandina is located 99 km south of Cherdyn (the district's administrative centre) by road. Kiryanova is the nearest rural locality.

References 

Rural localities in Cherdynsky District